The Eurasian eagle-owl was not considered to be naturally resident in Britain; however, there is evidence it was native to the UK some time ago. According to a BBC TV programme (2005), a pair bred for several years in a valley in Ministry of Defence land in North Yorkshire. There was some debate as to whether these birds were escapees or whether they have arrived naturally from the continent, which would only be a short journey from either France, the Low Countries or Scandinavia. At the time the program was made, they had reared 20 young to independence, and three young were in the nest. Nothing was known of what happened to those 20 young, except that one of them electrocuted itself on power lines in Shropshire. 

Another bird has been sighted several times in Heaton, Bolton, Greater Manchester. This bird was reported to have died in mid April 2007 due to secondary poisoning, perhaps from eating a contaminated dead rodent.
The BBC reported a pair nesting and aggressively protecting their brood from dog-walkers on a nearby footpath in Lancashire, England, in late May 2007.

However, a more recent BBC TV programme (2007) reported that the eagle-owl is becoming more common in the UK and is showing signs that it is becoming established, mirroring the recent rapid increase in the buzzard population with which it shares some similarities, particularly prey and habitat.

The recent apparent increase in successful wild breeding has attracted opposition from those who believe the owl to be a danger to native species and young livestock. Perhaps as a result, a few 'new' eagle-owls have been illegally killed, including the female in North Yorkshire that had successfully reared 23 young, who was shot dead in January 2006. This act was condemned as  "disgraceful" by the World Owl Trust.

A new pair in the Forest of Bowland, Lancashire, have  been attracting public attention due to having successfully reared three young to flight. There have also been reports of a further two pairs active in the local area as well as another pair breeding chicks in Northumberland in 2005.

Eagle-owls have also been confirmed breeding in Scotland, with sightings of wild birds confirmed in Galloway, Invernesshire, Sutherland and Slough. The World Owl Trust now believes that the eagle-owl should be added to the British Ornithologists' Union's list of official British birds – indicating the significance of the increase in wild pairs in Britain.

References

Fauna of Great Britain